The Holiday Inaugural Stakes is an American Thoroughbred horse race held annually in late November or early December at Turfway Park in Florence, Kentucky. It is a Listed race. The race has been run for over 30 years.

Recent Winners

Past winners

References

Turfway Park
Turfway Park horse races